Bird-and-flower painting, called  in Chinese, is a kind of Chinese painting with a long tradition in China and is considered one of the treasures of Chinese culture. The  was named after its subject matter. It originated in the Tang dynasty where it gained popularity, matured by the end of that period and during the Five Dynasties and Ten Kingdoms period, and fully reached its peak during the Song dynasty. Most  paintings belong to the scholar-artist style of Chinese painting. The  became prevalent in East Asia, where it was introduced in Japan during the 14th century and was introduced in Korea.

Intended purpose and cultural significance 

According to Chinese tradition, the  covers "flowers, birds, fish, and insects"; thus, it can deal with a wide range of natural topics, including flowers, fish, insects, birds, pets (dogs, cats), etc.

The  paintings are inspired by the resilience and the beauty of the flowers and birds found in nature. In Chinese culture, different types of birds and flowers held their own symbolic meanings; with some of them even holdings auspicious meanings, scholarly and human virtues, as well as principles.

Scholars-artists, in particular, developed a freehand-style painting as a mean to express their emotions and considered Chinese calligraphy and poetry as being an integral component of their  painting by giving their ares with a deeper spiritual meaning.

Schools and great artists 
The  is proper of 10th century China; and the most representative artists of this period are Huang Quan (c. 900 – 965), who was an imperial painter for many years, and Xu Xi (937–975), who came from a prominent family but had never entered into officialdom.Both Huang Quan and Xu Xi were masters of their two schools.

The first school, led by Huang Quan, was characterized by an "outline" method of brush work, with emphasis on bright colours filling a meticulously outline. Huang Quan used to paint based on exotic flowers, herbs, rare birds and animals which were found in the imperial gardens and palaces; his paintings were characterized by their meticulous nature as well as the bright colours.

The second school was led by Xu Xi whose paintings style became known as .His school was typically characterized with the use techniques associated with ink wash painting. 

These two schools would have important influences on  paintings of the later centuries.

Varieties based on painting technique
According to painting technique:
Ink wash painting (水墨花鳥/水墨花鳥畫). Representatives: Lin Liang (林良), Qi Baishi (齊白石), Zhang Daqian (張大千)
Fine-brush (工筆花鳥/工筆花鳥畫)
Fine-brush with Ink and Wash Painting (工筆水墨/兼工帶水墨). Representatives: Lin Liang (林良), Ren Yi (任頤)
Fine-brush with Colour (工彩)
 Fine-brush with Heavy Colour (工筆重彩)
 Fine-brush with Light Colour (工筆淡彩). Representatives: Emperor Huizong (趙佶), Lü Ji (呂紀), Lin Liang (林良)
Freehand style (寫意花鳥/寫意花鳥畫)
Great Freehand style (大寫意)
Slight Freehand style (小寫意). Representatives: Tang Yin (唐寅), Xu Wei (徐渭), Wu Changshuo (吳昌碩), Ren Yi (任頤)
Fine-brush with Freehand style (兼工帶寫)
Representatives: Lin Liang (林良), Tang Yin (唐寅), Ma Quan (馬荃)

In Japan 
 The bird-and-flower motif started appearing in Japanese art around the Muromachi period during the 14th century, and developed its own distinct style. It also entered ukiyo-e woodblock printing, where it was known as kachō-e (花鳥絵). Especially the shin hanga movement produced a number of works with this motif starting in the Meiji era. Artists working with this were Ohara Koson (1877–1945) and Ito Sozan (1884–?), as well as Imao Keinen (1845–1924).

See also
 Chinese painting
 Danqing
 Gongbi
 Bamboo painting
 Mogu
 Nanpin school

Gallery

References

External links

 Chinese Flower Painting at China Online Museum
 Chinese Bird Painting at China Online Museum

Birds in art
Chinese iconography
Chinese painting
Japanese iconography
Japanese painting
Korean iconography
Korean painting